Massachusetts v. Laird, 400 U.S. 886 (1970), was a case dealing with the conscription aspect of the Vietnam War that the Supreme Court declined to hear by a 6–3 vote.

The Commonwealth of Massachusetts challenged the constitutionality of the war.  It passed a law stating that no resident of Massachusetts "shall be required to serve" in the military abroad if the armed hostility has not been declared a war by Congress. The attorney general of Massachusetts asked the Supreme Court to hear its case to test the legality of the Vietnam War. 

The Supreme Court declined to hear the case due to a lack of jurisdiction.

External links
 
 

United States Supreme Court cases
United States Supreme Court cases of the Burger Court
1970 in United States case law
Opposition to United States involvement in the Vietnam War
Conscription in the United States
Conscription law